WQHL-FM (98.1 FM) is a country–formatted radio station licensed to Live Oak, Florida, United States, and also serving Lake City.  The station is currently owned by Southern Stone Communications as part of a conglomerate with Live Oak–licensed News Talk Information station WQHL (1250 AM), Live Oak–licensed sports radio station WJZS (106.1 FM), and Five Points–licensed hot adult contemporary station WCJX (106.5 FM). WQHL is also sister to Lake City–licensed stations, News Talk Information WDSR (1340 AM) and classic hits WNFB (94.3 FM) under a local marketing agreement with their owner Newman Media, Inc. The station maintains studios and transmitter facilities on Helvenston Street Southeast in southeastern Live Oak.

History

WQHL-FM went on the air in December 1973. The station would be acquired by Norm Protsman, owner of WNER (1250 AM, now WQHL. In 1988, Protsman would sell the two stations to Day Communications.

In 1999, Day passed away, with the family selling the stations to Southern Media Group. By 2001, WQHL-AM-FM would be owned by Black Crow Media Group. The stations would be sold to their current owner Southern Stone Communications in 2013.

Programming
Weekday programming on the station includes Non Stop Country overnight and The Lia Show at night.

References

External links

QHL-FM
Country radio stations in the United States
1973 establishments in Florida
Radio stations established in 1973